Coomber is a surname. Notable people with the surname include:

Alex Coomber (born 1973), English skeleton racer
Margaret Coomber (born 1950), British middle-distance runner
Trevor Coomber (born 1949), Australian politician

See also
Coomber's relationship, in physical chemistry